Zainal Arifin Paliwang (born 16 December 1962) is an Indonesian politician and the current governor of North Kalimantan. His inauguration as governor in February 2021 was attended by very few people, all of whom required PCR tests, due to COVID-19 health and safety protocol.

In mid-2021, Paliwang met with his counterpart, Isran Noor, to confirm details on the construction of a potential Berau-Bulungan toll road connecting North Kalimantan to East Kalimantan.

On February 8, 2022, his eldest son, Novandi Arya Kharizma, died in a car accident on Senen, Central Jakarta.

References

1962 births
Living people
People from South Sulawesi